Game Face is the tenth studio album by American rapper Master P, released on December 18, 2001. It marked the debut of The New No Limit Records and a partnership with Universal Records. There are three singles released from the album, "Ooohhhwee", "Real Love", and "Rock it", Music videos were released for all three. The album received a mixed reception from critics who saw some change in Master P's production choices from his producers and lyrical delivery but felt that it wasn't anything new from the genre.

Reception

Critical reception

Game Face garnered mixed reviews from music critics who saw some change in lyrical content and production but felt that it didn't deliver anything new to the genre. At Metacritic, which assigns a normalized rating out of 100 to reviews from mainstream critics, the album received an average score of 40, based on 4 reviews.

Shawn Edwards of Vibe praised Master P for using simplistic wordplay and different production on his songs to feel more accessible saying, "While P's rhyme schemes haven't changed much, he has improved his musical backdrops significantly." Tom Sinclair of Entertainment Weekly found most of the album to be pleasant concluding with, "there's something oddly comforting about the inexorability of it all." AllMusic editor Jason Birchmeier complimented Master P for changing his Southern sound into a more pop rap direction with the samples he used for his songs saying, "Game Face isn't any more impressive than any of his past few albums since Ghetto D. However, it is a much more accessible album because of the pop approach." Wise Q of HipHopDX found tracks like "The Farm," "Lose It and Get It Back" and "Back on Top" as stand outs from the album but felt that it didn't deliver anything new to the genre saying "Most reviews have substance but, like this CD, hip hop will be left feeling empty." The A.V. Clubs Nathan Rabin wrote, "A mercifully brief running time (less than 50 minutes) and a few scattered moments of autobiographical storytelling help make Gameface marginally less disposable than its most recent predecessors."

Commercial performance
The album debuted at number seventy-two on the Billboard 200 and sold 95,000 copies in its first week of sales. It later climbed up the charts and peaked at number fifty-three in early 2002.

Music videos
There was a music video for the single entitled "Real Love" featuring Sera-Lynn. There was also a music video for the single "Ooohhhwee".

Track listing

Charts

Album

Weekly charts

Year-end charts

Singles
Ooohhwee

Rock It

References

External links
 Game Face at ARTISTdirect

2001 albums
Master P albums
No Limit Records albums